Kútniky is a village and municipality in the Dunajská Streda District in the Trnava Region of south-west Slovakia.

Geography
The municipality lies at an altitude of 114 metres and covers an area of 10.986 km².

History
In the 9th century, the territory of Kútniky became part of the Kingdom of Hungary. In historical records, Hegybeneéte a component village of the municipality was mentioned in 1380. In 1910 Hegybeneéte village had 192, while Töböréte village 165, for the most part, Hungarian inhabitants.
Until the end of World War I, it was part of Hungary and fell within the Dunaszerdahely district of Pozsony County. After the Austro-Hungarian army disintegrated in November 1918, Czechoslovakian troops occupied the area. After the Treaty of Trianon of 1920, the village became officially part of Czechoslovakia. In November 1938, the First Vienna Award granted the area to Hungary and it was held by Hungary until 1945. Hegybeneéte and Töböréte villages were unified in 1940 under the name of Hegyéte, to which Blažov (Balázsfa) and Podafa villages were attached in 1960, but the latter became independent in 1990 again.
After Soviet occupation in 1945, Czechoslovakian administration returned and the village became officially part of Czechoslovakia in 1947.

Demography 
At the 2001 Census the recorded population of the village was 932 while an end-2008 estimate by the Statistical Office had the villages's population as 1208. As of 2001, 87.45% of its population was Hungarians and 10.62% were Slovaks. Roman Catholicism is the majority religion of the village, its adherents numbering 85.30% of the total population.

References

External links
Local news selection at www.parameter.hu 

Villages and municipalities in Dunajská Streda District
Hungarian communities in Slovakia